The Colombo Cup was an annual football tournament first held in Colombo, Ceylon. It was also known as Asian Quadrangular Football Tournament. Established in 1952 by the Ceylon Football Association as a part of the Colombo Fair, teams from India, Pakistan, Sri Lanka (formerly known as Ceylon) and Burma played each other in a round robin tournament. The tournament was last played in 1955. In 1953 it was hosted in Rangoon, Burma, in 1954 at Calcutta, India, and finally at Lahore, Pakistan.

Results

Medal table

* = host

See also  
Football in Asia

References

 
Sport in Colombo
Defunct international association football competitions in Asia
Recurring sporting events established in 1952
Recurring sporting events disestablished in 1955